Forfar Farmington Football Club are a Scottish FA Quality Mark Community Football Club who are based at Station Park in Forfar, Angus. They were members of the top division Scottish Women's Premier League (SWPL) from 2005 until withdrawing from the competition in 2021.

Women's Teams

Forfar Farmington (SWPL)
The club's senior side (listed as Forfar Farmington), currently plays in the Scottish Women's Premier League having been promoted from the Scottish Women's First Division in the summer of 2005.
With the exception of Glasgow City, Forfar Farmington have secured the most successful league finishes in recent years for a Women's team operating fully independent of a provincial men's football club.

Due to problems with player recruitment, Farmington struggled to build a competitive squad for the 2021–22 season. After losing their first match of the season 10–0 against Dundee United in the League Cup, the club chose to withdraw from the SWPL before the start of the new season and concentrate on youth and community schemes.

Current squad
.

Forfar Farmington Reserves
Established in January 2010 using the name 'Forfar Farmington Ladies', the club's second tier side played in the Scottish Women's Second Division (North) before moving to Scottish Women's Football League Second Division East for season 2011 where they would secure the league title. The side contained a high number of experienced players who assisted in helping the team reach the Semi Finals of the Scottish Women's Football League Cup in their first season of participation. The side was re-branded 'Forfar Farmington Reserves' for season 2012, where it will participate in the Scottish Women's First Division

Forfar Farmington Ladies
Farmington Ladies play in the Scottish Women's Second Division (North)  for 2012, having used the name Farmington Blues in the previous two seasons.

Farmington won the SWPL 2 in 2017 to return to the first tier of Scottish women's football for the 2018 season.

References

External links
 Official Website Of Forfar Farmington F.C.

Women's football clubs in Scotland
1984 establishments in Scotland
Football clubs in Angus, Scotland
Scottish Women's Premier League clubs
Forfar
Association football clubs established in 1984